Maulviganj, is a commercial and residential locality in Lucknow. It was established by Asaf-ud-Daula.

References

Neighbourhoods in Lucknow